Cerradomys maracajuensis, also known as the Maracaju oryzomys, is a rodent species from South America. It is terrestrial and is found in gallery forests in Bolivia, Paraguay and nearby Brazil and Peru. It was first discovered near the Brazilian city of Maracaju.

References

Literature cited

Percequillo, A.R., E. Hingst-Zaher, and C.R. Bonvicino. 2008. Systematic review of genus Cerradomys Weksler, Percequillo and Voss, 2006 (Rodentia: Cricetidae: Sigmodontinae: Oryzomyini), with description of two new species from Eastern Brazil. American Museum Novitates 3622: 1–46.

Mammals of Brazil
Cerradomys
Mammals described in 2002